Gary C. Cason (born March 2, 1943) is an American politician. He served as a Republican member for the 96th district of the Georgia House of Representatives.

Life and career 
Cason was born in Muscogee County, Georgia. He attended Columbus State University and Auburn University.

In 1977, Cason was elected to represent the 96th district of the Georgia House of Representatives. He served until 1983, when he was succeeded by Milton Hirsch. He ran for re-election in 1984 against Hirsch.

References 

1943 births
Living people
People from Muscogee County, Georgia
Republican Party members of the Georgia House of Representatives
20th-century American politicians
Columbus State University alumni
Auburn University alumni